In the biological nomenclature codes, an anagram can be used to name a new taxon. 

Wordplays are one source of inspiration allowing organisms to receive scientific names. In the binomial nomenclature, as scientists have latitude in naming genera and species, a taxon name can therefore be an anagram, provided it remains pronounceable. For example, in the International Code of Nomenclature for algae, fungi, and plants, a new generic name can be taken from the name of a person by using an anagram or abbreviation of it.

William Elford Leach was among the first naturalists to use taxonomic anagrams, and, in 1818, he described several isopod genera that were
each other's anagrams of 'Caroline' : Conilera, Lironeca, Nerocila, Olencira, and Rocinela.

List in botany

Notes

References 

Taxonomic lists
Taxonomy (biology)
Anagrams
Lists of things named after people
Biological nomenclature
Nomenclature codes